The Best of Corpus Delicti is the second compilation album, and last album by gothic rock band Corpus Delicti. They made one more album, called Syn:Drom, under the name Corpus.

Track listing
"The Lake"
"...of all Desperations"
"Lorelei"
"Broken"
"Dancing Ghost"
"Dust & Fire"
"Dragon Song"
"Treasures"
"Atmosphere"
"The Drift"
"Haunting Picture"
"The Awakening"
"Lies Spoken"
"Last Light"

Lyrics by Sebastien
Music by Corpus Delicti
Except Track 9, by Ian Curtis and Joy Division

Corpus Delicti (band) compilation albums
1998 compilation albums